Ilya Yuryevich Baulchev (born 2 October 1988) is a Russian football player.

Club career
He made his debut in the Russian Football National League for FC Metallurg Lipetsk on 17 July 2021 in a game against FC Orenburg.

References

External links
 
 Profile by Russian Football National League

1988 births
Footballers from Voronezh
Living people
Russian footballers
Association football defenders
FC Metallurg Lipetsk players
Russian Second League players
Russian First League players